Brian Roy "Spinner" Spencer (September 3, 1949 – June 3, 1988) was a Canadian professional ice hockey player who played ten seasons in the National Hockey League for the Buffalo Sabres, Toronto Maple Leafs, New York Islanders and Pittsburgh Penguins.

Career
Brian Spencer was drafted in the fifth round, 55th overall by the Toronto Maple Leafs in the 1969 NHL Entry Draft. On December 12, 1970, when Spencer was called up to play with the Leafs in what would be his first NHL game on television, he telephoned his father Roy in British Columbia to tell him to watch the game that night on Hockey Night in Canada. Spencer was to be interviewed between periods of the game. However, a game featuring the Vancouver Canucks versus the California Golden Seals was aired instead. Infuriated, Roy Spencer drove  to Prince George, where the closest TV station, CKPG-TV (then a CBC Television affiliate), is located. When he arrived, he ordered station staff, at gunpoint, to broadcast the Maple Leafs game instead. The station complied, but as Roy Spencer left the station, he was confronted by the RCMP. After a brief stand-off Roy Spencer was shot and killed.

After several seasons with Toronto and the New York Islanders, Spencer was acquired by the Buffalo Sabres. Spencer had his best offensive production in a Sabres uniform when he scored 41 points (12 goals, 29 assists) in 1974–75. Spencer played well in Buffalo and was extremely popular with the fans at Buffalo's Memorial Auditorium. His hustle, aggressive play, and hitting ability were things the fans admired.  Spencer developed into a solid two-way player. He would however be dealt to the Pittsburgh Penguins in September 1977.

His offensive production declined as he took on the role of a checking forward with the Penguins. Spencer's last NHL season came in 1978–79 when he played seven games for Pittsburgh. He then finished his playing career in the AHL (Binghamton, Springfield and Hershey) and retired after the 1979–80 season.

Death
After hockey, Spencer submerged himself in a life of alcohol and violence. In 1987, he was charged with kidnapping and murder and faced the death penalty. Family and friends, including ex-teammates, gathered around him and tried to help. A former teammate from the Sabres, Rick Martin, tried to help by testifying as a character witness at his trial. The jury returned a not guilty verdict in March 1988 and Spencer vowed to change his life. Despite the acquittal and a move to Florida, Spencer's life continued to spiral out of control. Three months later, Spencer would die under similar circumstances to his father; he was fatally shot in a robbery following a crack cocaine purchase in Riviera Beach, Florida.

Spencer was survived by five children from two marriages, and his twin brother, Byron.

A book on Brian's life Gross Misconduct: The Life of Spinner Spencer, written by Martin O'Malley, was adapted in 1993 by Paul Gross and directed by  Atom Egoyan into a made-for-television film in Canada, Gross Misconduct: The Life of Brian Spencer.

In 1999, Spencer's daughter and grandson were killed in a car accident in Oklahoma.

Career statistics

Regular season and playoffs

See also
List of unsolved murders

Notes

References
 Players:The Ultimate A-Z Guide of Everyone Who Has Ever Played in the NHL by Andrew Podnieks, 
 Penguin's Profiles: Pittsburgh's Boys of Winter. O'Brien, James P. 1994, Retrieved 17 Nov. 2006.

External links

 IMDB page for "Gross Misconduct" (1993) - a Canadian TV movie based on Spencer's life
 Spinning Out of Control, The Brian Spencer Story at The Hockey Writers

1949 births
1988 deaths
1988 murders in the United States
Binghamton Dusters players
Buffalo Sabres players
Calgary Centennials players
Canadian expatriate ice hockey players in the United States
Canadian ice hockey left wingers
Canadian people murdered abroad
Deaths by firearm in Florida
Estevan Bruins players
Hershey Bears players
Ice hockey people from British Columbia
Male murder victims
New York Islanders players
People acquitted of murder
People from the Regional District of Bulkley-Nechako
People murdered in Florida
Pittsburgh Penguins players
Regina Pats players
Springfield Indians players
Swift Current Broncos players
Toronto Maple Leafs draft picks
Toronto Maple Leafs players
Tulsa Oilers (1964–1984) players
Unsolved murders in the United States